Painuli (पैनुलि), correctly spelled as Panuly ((पैन्यूली)) or Painuly is a Brahmin community primarily from the Indian state of Uttarakhand.

They belong to the Bharadwaja Gotra and Vashishth Gotra are a member of Garhwali People.

Maa Rajarajeshwari is the Kul/Isth Devi and Guru Bhairav Nath/Guru Batuk Nath is the Kul/Isth Devata or the family deities of the Painulis.

In Garhwali language the word breaks into 'Paini' which means sharp and long, and 'Lol' means head or more specifically forehead. This group is also known as 'Lekhwar' clan because these people did all the reading/writing and accounting work for the King of Garhwal apart from being their priests.

Social groups of Uttarakhand
Brahmin communities of Uttarakhand